Moorhuhn is a German casual game franchise for PCs and various other platforms. It consists of more than 30 games, the first of which, a shoot 'em up, was Germany's most popular computer game in the early 2000s. The first titles in the series were released as freeware. Since 2003, the games were released as Crazy Chicken in English, and some as Chicken Hunter.

History

Original game

The original Moorhuhn game (now distributed as Die Original Moorhuhn Jagd) was developed by the Hamburg-based Art Department advertising agency and the Dutch Witan studios as an advertisement for Johnnie Walker whisky in 1998. Imitating the Glorious Twelfth, the game's objective was to shoot down in the Scottish Highlands, through a point-and-click interface, as many cartoonish "swamp chickens" (literally "moorhens", i.e. willow ptarmigans) as possible in 90 seconds. The game was originally known as KippenSchieten and won third place at the Bizarre 98 programmer's meeting.

The game was originally not intended for distribution, but was made available in autumn 1998 to play on laptops in bars by promoters dressed up as hunters. It was since then illicitly copied, and became widely available for download on private websites. The publisher's initial irritation at this subsided after the game received favorable mentions in popular media and demand for it grew. From the beginning of 1999, the game was officially made available for download by Art Department. It became wildly popular in German-speaking Europe, to the point of being denounced in the media as a threat to the bottom line of businesses, on account of the number of hours wasted by employees playing the game.

The game's success spawned a great deal of merchandise, a comic book series, an animated TV series, several motion picture scripts (although no movie was ever made) and a BMG-produced single (Gimme more Huhn by comedian Wigald Boning). It also caused Germany's authoritative Duden dictionary to include the word "Moorhuhnjagd".

Successor games
In the sequel Moorhuhn 2, the player also has 90 seconds to shoot down chickens to gain as many points as possible, but other animals can be hit as well. Moorhuhn: Winter-Edition is a remake of the second game, set in winter. Moorhuhn 3 ...Chicken Chase takes place by the sea. Moorhuhn X from 2003 takes place in the countryside again, the surroundings are generated in 3D and the chickens perform animated motion sequences instead of simply flying around. Moorhuhn Wanted takes place in a wild west setting, and chicken can shoot the player. Moorhuhn Remake celebrated original the Moorhuhn's fifth anniversary, featuring enhanced graphics and new music.

In the Moorhuhn Invasion, the player shoots at alien chickens that have invaded Earth. Moorhuhn: Approaching is an arcade side-scrolling shooter with 17 levels. Moorhuhn Pirates is a classic shooter again. In modern operating systems most early Moorhuhn games are now unplayable, with the exception of the first game, the second game and the Director's Cut. For these systems, Moorhuhn Deluxe was released on Microsoft Store and Steam, as a remake of Moorhuhn X. Moorhuhn VR is a Moorhuhn X variation for mobile devices, in which players can look around in 360 degrees.

Corporate history
The developer of the games was Bochum-based company Phenomedia AG, who had acquired Art Department Werbeagentur GmbH (creator of the original game). It went public in late 1999 at the height of the dot-com bubble and attained a market value of up to one billion Euro.

In 2002, the stock value rapidly collapsed after it became known that the company's leaders were under investigation for falsifying balance sheets. Chairman of the Vorstand Markus Scheer and CFO (Finanzvorstand) Björn Denhard, who confessed to the falsifications, were fired. In 2009, they were sentenced by a German court to 46 and 36 months' imprisonment, respectively, for securities fraud and other infractions.

Phenomedia AG underwent insolvency proceedings. Its assets, including the Moorhuhn series, were bought by a successor company, Phenomedia publishing GmbH, which continued to develop Moorhuhn games. The franchise was published by AK tronic GmbH.

List of Moorhuhn games

Other media

Game soundtrack 
Nils Fritze was the composer of all Moorhuhn games since Moorhuhn Winter-Edition (2001) until mid-2006. Georg Heckermann and Gunther Glöckner were responsible for the soundtrack of Schatzjäger 2, Henrik Jacoby for Schatzjäger 3 and Kai Walter (Snap Dragon Games) for the sequel Moorhuhn Atlantis. Moorhuhn Kart 3 and Thunder as well as  Director's Cut were scored by Haiko Ruttmann.

The soundtrack for the game Moorhuhn Tiger & Chicken was composed by Jan Klose/Tilman Sillescu (Dynamedion), Helge Borgarts contributed some tracks. The soundtrack was played by the Staatskapelle Halle.

Short films 
In 2001, a total of 26 one-minute animated films were produced, which were shown in commercial breaks of German TV stations. Santiago Ziesmer voiced the Moorhuhn, which only made chicken noises.

Film 
In September 2011, the production of a Moorhuhn feature film was announced by Phenomedia. The film was to be produced by Douglas Welbat and Nova Entertainment Cinema. A year later, the script was funded with a grant of 45,000 euros from the public Filmförderungsanstalt (FFA), at the time the highest funding of the Screenplay Commission. Nothing more came of the project.

References

External links
 

Casual games
Video games developed in Germany
Video games developed in the Netherlands
Shooter video games
1999 video games
Video game franchises
PlayStation 2 games
Video games about birds
Windows games
Windows-only games